Tanga is the most northerly port city of Tanzania on the west of the Indian Ocean, and the capital of Tanga Region. It had a population of 221,127 in 2012. The city is also home to the Port of Tanga. The name Tanga means "sail" in Swahili.

The city is also the capital of Tanga District.

Economy
Major exports from the port of Tanga include sisal, coffee, tea, and cotton. Tanga is also an important railroad terminus, connecting much of the northern Tanzanian interior with the sea via the Tanzania Railways Corporation's Link Line and Central Line. Tanga is linked to the African Great Lakes region and the Tanzanian economic capital of Dar es Salaam. The city is served by Tanga Airport.

The harbour and surrounding is the centre of life in Tanga. It has several markets in several neighbourhoods.

History

Early history
The earliest documentation about Tanga comes from the Portuguese. A trading post was established by the Portuguese as part of their East African coastal territory and controlled the region for over 200 years between 1500 and 1700.

The Sultanate of Oman battled the Portuguese and gained control of the settlement by mid-1700 along with Mombasa, Pemba Island and Kilwa Kisiwani. The town continued to act as a trading port for ivory and slaves under the sultan's rule.

Tanga continued to be a prosperous trading hub for slaves with the Arab world up until 1873 when the European powers abolished the slave trade.

German East Africa

In the 19th Century, growing interests by Europeans for the Scramble for Africa brought the Germans to Tanga. The Germans bought the coastal strip of mainland Tanzania from the Sultan of Zanzibar in 1891. This takeover designated Tanga into a township and was the first establishment in German East Africa. The town became the centre of German colonial administration before the establishment of Dar es Salaam in the early 20th century. Tanga was chosen in 1889 as a military post of German East Africa, and it became a district office in 1891. The town saw rapid expansion and planned growth under the German occupation. A tram line was built in the city for domestic transport and a port was also built for exports. In 1896 the construction of the Usambara Railway began and was extended to Moshi by 1912. Roads, bridges and the railway enabled industrial growth in the region and many buildings and bridges that are still in operation today in the town are from the German colonial period. The local economy was based mainly on the production of sisal, which had been brought to the colony several years earlier, and population in the area grew rapidly.

British invasion and rule
As the coastal town closest to British East Africa, Tanga was on the front line of the East African campaign at the beginning of World War I. On 4 November 1914 a landing by British and Empire forces was repelled in the Battle of Tanga. On 13 June 1916 the Royal Navy battleship  and protected cruisers  and  bombarded Tanga. On 7 July the protected cruiser  and monitor  entered Manza Bay and put troops ashore who occupied the town.

After the War, Britain gained control of Tanganyika and continued to develop Tanga and exploit its agricultural potential. In 1919 Tanga was the country's fourth largest city, but at independence it was the second largest city after Dar es Salaam.

Post-independence
In the early stages of independence, the Port of Tanga continued to be a gateway for the export of sisal from the region. However, following the adopting of the Ujamaa policy, agriculture in the region collapsed and the city lost its value. With the government controlling the agriculture trade and the depreciation in the world prices of Sisal the port began to lose revenue.

Economy
Tanga Cement is one of the major industries.

Transport

Air connectivity

Tanga has a small airport and is currently served by only three regional airlines, providing scheduled services to Dar es Salaam, Pemba Island and Zanzibar. In 2014 the airport served less than 30,000 passengers. There are also a small number of private airstrips in the surrounding area around the city that facilitate the private estates and surrounding industries.

Road connectivity
Tanga city lies approximately 250 km from Chalinze on the A14 highway that runs from Chalinze to Mombasa. The town is 75 km away from Segera which is a junction linking the A14 and the B1. The B1 highway is a bypass that links Moshi and the northern corridor to Tanga.

Port of Tanga

The port is historically the oldest operating harbour in the nation and its roots date back to around the 6th century. The Port of Tanga is the second largest port in Tanzania and is a vital part to the city's initial development and economy. The port operates at 90% of its installed capacity and its main cargo is coal for the cement industry and is a new gate way for crude oil products. The ports authority has major plans to upgrade the port increase capacity and provide an alternative route for cargo flowing into the country.

Rail connectivity
Tanga is the starting point of the narrow gauge northern railway network that ends in Arusha. Construction of this line was started in the 19th century by the Germans. In 2018, the Government of Tanzania invested 5.7 billion Tanzanian Shillings to rehabilitate the line. As of July 2019, diesel powered cargo trains are leaving Tanga Railway Station again and passenger transport between Tanga and Arusha is set to start in September 2019.

Geography

Climate
Due to close proximity to the equator and the warm Indian Ocean, the city experiences tropical climatic conditions similar to all Tanzanian coastal cities. The city experiences hot and humid weather throughout much of the year and has a tropical wet and dry climate (Köppen: Aw). Annual rainfall is approximately 1,290 mm (51 in), and in a normal year there are two rainy seasons: "the long rains" in April and May and "the short rains" in November and December.

Healthcare
Tanga city medical institutions include:
Bombo Regional Hospital
National Institute of Medical Research Centre, Tanga
Amani Biomedical Research Laboratory
Tanga AIDS Working Group

Tourist sites
Nearby tourist attractions include Amboni Caves, Galanos hot springs, Saadani national park, Toten Island, URITHI Tanga Museum, war graves and memorials, Tongoni Ruins, Ndumi Village defense works, Mwarongo sand beaches and protected coastal mangroves.

Sport
Tanga is represented in the Tanzanian Premier League by football clubs Coastal Union, JKT Mgambo, and African Sports (Wana Kimanumanu) from the 2015–2016 season.

Twin towns – sister cities
Tanga is twinned with:
 Eckernförde, Germany (1963)
 Kemi, Finland (2007)
 Tifariti, Western Sahara
 Toledo, United States (2001)

Gallery

See also
Historic Swahili Settlements

References

Sources
 Byron Farwell, The Great War in Africa, 1914-1918 (W. W. Norton, 1986)

External links

 Tanga Tourist Guide

Swahili people
Swahili city-states
Swahili culture
 
Cities in Tanzania
Populated places in Tanga Region
Regional capitals in Tanzania
Port cities in Tanzania